Lake Livingston State Park is located near Livingston in Polk County, Texas. It is in the southern portion of the Piney Woods region of the state, an hour north of Houston. The 635 acre park  along Lake Livingston opened in 1977.

Facilities 
Camping
 Campsites with water
 Campsites with water and electricity
 Full-hookup campsites
 Premium full-hookup campsites
 Screened shelters
 Picnic pavilions
 Activity center

Amenities
 Park store
 Fire rings
 Water/sewer hookups
 30- and 50-amp service
 Restrooms/showers
 Leashed pets permitted outdoors
 Picnic areas
 3 boat ramps
 2 fish-cleaning stations
 Pier
 Swimming

Activities 

 Swimming
 Fishing (rods, reels, & tackle available on loan via Texas Parks and Wildlife Department's Tackle Loaner Program) 
 Boating
 Rentals (Thursday–Sunday, 8:30 A.M – 3:30 P.M) 
 Canoeing
 Kayaking (single and double)
 Paddleboarding
 Biking
 Hiking
 Camping
 Birdwatching
 Picnicking
 Geocaching
 Ranger programs & tours
 Junior Ranger Explorer Packs on loan

Attractions 
 Big Thicket National Preserve
 Sam Houston National Forest
 Ball fields
 Bowling alley
 Golf course
 Tennis court
 Municipal airport
 Polk County Library and Memorial Museum

References

External links 

 Lake Livingston State Park

State parks of Texas